Benoît Paire was the defending champion, but decided not to compete.

Steve Johnson won the title, defeating Kenny de Schepper in the final, 6–1, 6–7(5–7), 7–6(7–2).

Seeds

Draw

Finals

Top half

Bottom half

References
 Main Draw
 Qualifying Draw

Open Guadeloupe - Singles
2014 Singles